The Belarus Black Pied, also known as the Byelorussian Black Pied, the White-Russian Black Pied, and the Spotted Black Pied, is a breed of domestic pig from Belarus. It was originally crossbred in Minsk in the late 19th century from the breeding of Large White, Large Black, Berkshire, and Middle White pigs with native Belarus pigs. The Belarus Black Pied wasn't recognized as a separate breed group until 1957 and not as an individual breed until 1976.

References

Pig breeds originating in Belarus